Boss is a 2013 Indian Hindi-language action comedy film directed by Anthony D'Souza and written by Farhad-Sajid. It was produced by Cape of Good Films and Ashwin Varde Productions and features Akshay Kumar in the lead role, along with Mithun Chakraborty, Shiv Panditt, Ronit Roy and Aditi Rao Hydari. It is a remake of the Malayalam film Pokkiri Raja. The film released worldwide on 16 October 2013.

Plot
The film starts with school teacher Satyakant Acharya Shastri who has two children: Surya and Shiv. After Surya picks up brawls with another child multiple times and eventually kills him, Satyakant kicks him out and disowns him. Years later, Shiv grows up as the only son to his father. It is revealed that, after being disowned, Surya had saved the life of a transport businessman Tauji a.k.a. Big Boss who had taken him in and raised him like a son for 15 years. Now, Surya has transformed himself into Boss, a suave, tough transport businessman who fights for justice.

Shiv falls in love with Ankita, an early college acquaintance, who turns out to be sister of the corrupt Assistant Commissioner of Police Ayushman Thakur. Ayushman is in cahoots with the corrupt and power-hungry Home Minister, Shoorvar Pradhan. Pradhan suggests to Ayushman that he should get Ankita married to his son Vishal. Ayushman agrees and decides that Ankita will marry him whether she wants to or not. Upon finding out she is in love with Shiv, he has Shiv arrested and convicted for crimes he hasn't committed. It is also revealed that Surya didn't murder his classmate. Instead, Satyakant accidentally impaled him when he shoved them into a room so that they would learn to deal with each other.

Satyakant then tries to bail Shiv out and calmly explains to Ayushman. He is instead humiliated and thrown out of the police station. Without any choice, Satyakant turns to his other son for help, visits Boss and gives him a photograph of Shiv, which convinces Surya that Shiv's life is in danger.

Boss meets Ayushman and Vishal convinces him to free Shiv from all charges, telling him that Boss would kill Shiv when he is released from the police custody. Boss, however, helps Shiv escape from custody. Pradhan sends his cops to capture Boss and take him to Ayushman's farmhouse. Boss escapes from the goons and reaches Ayushman's farm house. Pradhan calls Tauji there to complain about Boss. In front of Tauji, Pradhan cancels his contract of killing Shiv with Tauji. After noticing Ankita, Surya asks her whether she loves Shiv — she replies positively. He takes the responsibility of getting Ankita married to Shiv in front of Tauji and her brother Ayushman. Satyakant and Shiv are attacked by a contract killer, Jabbar Bhai, and his goons, sent by Pradhan. Surya decapitates Jabbar Bhai and his gang, saving his father and brother.

Twenty-five of the MLAs of Pradhan's political party are caught red-handed at a brothel with prostitutes by the media with the help of an unknown informer, later revealed to be Boss. Ayushman sets a trap against Shiv by setting up Ankita's friend Dimple and arrests Shiv in a fake rape case. Surya then tortures Vishal and sets a fake time bomb in his bum to get him ask his father to get Shiv freed from police custody. Tauji informs Satyakant that Surya did not kill his schoolmate and that it was an accident. Satyakant rushes to meet Surya along with Tauji, but their car is hit by a truck sent by Ayushman. Tauji survives the accident; Satyakant is injured and hospitalized. Finally, Boss brutally defeats Ayushman followed by a long fight. In the end, Satyakant with Shiv is shown opening his arms calling Boss to hug and they reunite.

Cast
 Akshay Kumar as Suryakant "Surya" Shastri / Boss, Satyakant’s elder son, Shiv’s elder brother, The main protagonist of the film
 Rushiraj Pawar as Young Surya
 Mithun Chakraborty as Satyakant Shastri, Surya and Shiv’s father
 Ronit Roy as ACP Ayushman Thakur, a corrupt police officer, Ankita’s elder brother, The main antagonist of the film
 Shiv Panditt as Shivakant "Shiv" Shastri, Satyakant’s younger son, Surya’s younger brother, Ankita’s love interest
 Shivansh Kotia as Young Shiv
 Aditi Rao Hydari as Ankita Thakur, Ayushman’s sister, Shiv’s love interest
 Danny Denzongpa as Tauji (Big Boss), Surya’s mentor and father figure
 Johnny Lever as Zorawar Singh, Surya’s sidekick
 Sanjay Mishra as Trilok, Surya’s sidekick
 Parikshit Sahni as Raghunath
 Govind Namdeo as Minister Pradhan, a corrupt minister working with Ayushman
 Aakash Dabhade as Vishal Pradhan, The minister’s son
 Hunar Hali as Dimple
 Mushtaq Khan as Constable Yadav
 Mukesh Tiwari as Thanedaar
 Shakti Kapoor as Nandu Plumber
 Amitabh Bachchan as Narrator
 Sonakshi Sinha in a special appearance in two songs.
 Prabhudeva in a special appearance in song "Hum Na Tode"
 Yo Yo Honey Singh in a special appearance in song "Party All Night"
 Sudesh Berry as Dushyanth
 Pradeep Kabra as Lalan (Big Boss's driver)
Sudhir Chaudhary as journalist
 Shakti Kapoor as Nandu Plumber

Production

Development
The director, Anthony D'Souza, and the script writers during the scripting stages were searching for a magnanimous character who could do justice to the role of Akshay Kumar – Boss in the film – who is portrayed as a gangster who is ever-ready to help the needy and a larger-than-life character. They chose veteran actor Amitabh Bachchan as the narrator who would introduce Boss.

According to reports Amitabh Bachchan was sent the script in advance and journalist-turned-producer Ashwin Varde (for whom the film marks his first project as a producer) offered Bachchan the role personally over a phone call which he readily accepted. Bachchan, in spite of his hectic schedule, completed the dubbing session at the earliest, on 31 August 2013 at 8:30 pm IST in Juhu's BR Dubbing Theater in 30 minutes. To the crew's pleasant surprise he improvised his lines as well.

Casting

Akshay Kumar played a kind-hearted Haryanvi hero, known as 'Boss', and Mithun Chakraborty enacted the role of his father. Shiv Panditt portrayed Akshay Kumar's younger brother's role and Aditi Rao Hydari is paired opposite him. Danny Denzongpa played Boss's mentor and Ronit Roy played a ruthless police officer who is pitted against Kumar. Ronit Roy plays the role of a police officer up against the titular character, Boss, marking the first instance where he is the antagonist of a film. It is also the second consecutive instance where his role is that of a police officer, with Shootout at Wadala being the last one, in which he played Inspector Raja Ambat, based on real-life encounter specialist Raja Tambat. Roy and Akshay Kumar have an action sequence at the climax of the film, one its highlights, shot in temperatures exceeding 47 degrees Celsius in Thailand and involving high-octane stunts that both actors performed successfully. Ronit Roy and Akshay Kumar acted in a movie after 20 years, Sainik (1993).

Soundtrack

Promotional video for the first and title track of the film was released on YouTube on 30 August 2013 on the official channel of T-Series, the music label that has purchased the music rights of the film and subsequently for legal purchase as a soundtrack single on digital music platform, iTunes.

"Boss Title Song" as composed by Meet Bros Anjjan, sung by Anjjan Bhatacharya, Harmeet Singh & Manmeet Singh consists of rap verses performed by Yo Yo Honey Singh with lyrics penned by Kumaar. It was released on 6 September 2013, after an effective promotional strategy of building hype around it by releasing two teasers named Aunty Police Bulalegi and Bajatey Raho. The teasers containing snippets of the song of length 12 and 10 seconds respectively were released on 5 September 2013.

For Sonakshi Sinha it marks her third special appearance in a song since she had featured in "Go Go Govinda" and "Thank God Its Friday" from the 2012 film OMG – Oh My God! and 2013 film Himmatwala respectively. In the former she appeared alongside Prabhu Deva; it also starred Akshay Kumar in a supporting role. Akshay Kumar, who portrays the title character, Boss, and Yo Yo Honey Singh appear in the track with 600 foreign models hired to perform as background dancers. The dance moves were choreographed by the rising star of choreography Mudassar Khan, with Mudassar having earlier choreographed songs like "Desi Beat," "Dhinka Chika" and "Character Dheela" from the 2011 films Bodyguard and Ready respectively.

The song "Party All Night" was launched on television during the grand finale of Dance India Dance Super Moms, a reality TV series. The reason for choosing the stage being Mithun Chakrabarty's or 'Mithunda' (as he is fondly referred to by Akshay Kumar) involvement in both the film and the TV show. He plays the role of Akshay Kumar's character, Boss's father in the former and is a judge in the latter. The ninth track of the music album titled "Boss Ganpati – Mix" was added to the soundtrack later on request of Akshay Kumar and was recorded two days before the release owing to the huge appreciation of the title track which released 10 days earlier. This is a version of the song with lyrics crediting the Hindu elephant God Ganesh as the boss or king of all gods. The lyrics are written by Kumaar while the song was composed by Meet Bros Anjjan. This version differs from the original one in respect of lyrics pertaining to the Lord and use of Dhols and Lejhim beats. The track will be distributed free of cost across the Ganesh pandals across the city of Mumbai and the state of Maharashtra on the first day of Ganesh Chaturthi which will be visited Kumar to offer prayers.

The song "Hum Na Tode" was composed by first-time composer P. A. Deepak, who had previously mixed sound most notably for A. R. Rahman in the Academy Award-winning film Slumdog Millionaire and consequently won a Grammy Award for it. "Hum Na Tode" is an adapted version of the immensely popular Tamil song  "Appadi Podu" from the Vijay starred 2004 film Ghilli, composed by Vidyasagar. Its adapted version "Hum Na Tode" is sung by Vishal Dadlani. The song "Har Kisi Ko Nahi Milta" composed by Kalyanji Anandji for the 1986 film Janbaaz was re-adapted for the soundtrack by Chirantan Bhatt and has two versions. One is sung by Nikhil D'Souza and the other by Arijit Singh.

Sandeep Shirodkar composed the film score.

The soundtrack CD containing the songs was released on 9 September 2013 to coincide with Akshay Kumar's birthday along with the auspicious festival of Ganesh Chaturthi with lyrics by penned by Kumaar, Manoj Yadav and Sahil Kaushal consisting of nine tracks with Meet Bros Anjjan composing five of them and P. A. Deepak and Chirantan Bhatt composing the rest.

Critical response

Mohar Basu reviewed the soundtrack for Koimoi. Flagging off the review acknowledging the appreciation the soundtrack has drawn from its audiences – owing to its high entertainment quotient and energy that is making its presence felt in each and every track – stated that having four music directors (Meet Bros Anjjan, P. A. Deepak, Chirantan Bhatt and Yo Yo Honey Singh) did not have a negative effect. The songs with their lyrics and vibrant flavour "command an attractive fervor mostly". She reviewed each song individually. The reviewer concluded the review saying though the album is not a musical masterpiece in composition it will ensure that the audience will have a good time owing largely to the "powerful entertaining zing." The album resonates more so with "Hum Na Tode" and title track being the best among the tracks as a whole.

Joginder Tuteja reviewed the soundtrack album for Rediff. He started the review building on the fact the title and setting of a masala or entertainer film needed an album without a single dull moment for its audience and it delivered just that. Commenting on the title song he credited it to be extremely impressive and the same time groovy at first listen. The mix of hip hop, Indian and Western sounds with a tad of Hariyanvi flavour and lyrics by Kumaar with the entertainment of masses being its foci working in the songs tremendous recall value. This is extended by the addition of another 'remix' version of the song and a theme version with vocals by Sonu Kakkar and Khushboo Grewal. The second song, "Hum Na Tode," is an adapted track of hugely popular Tamil song composed by Vidyasagar, Appadi Podu. A fast-paced addictive track – boasting of ferocious and aggressive vocals by Vishal Dadlani, adapted by P.A. Deepak and lyrics by Kumaar – consolidates the album's positive impact on its audiences. The next track Pitah Se Naam Tera a soft and subtle track after two fast faced ones. The track emphasises a father's importance and comparing him to be no less than God. The reviewer appreciated the choice of Sonu Nigam as the singer, the backing vocals of Meet Bros Anjjan and alaps by Sanjay Misra along with the devotional appeal the song commands. The next song Party All Night composed and sung by Honey Singh according to the reviewer is the pick of the album and in spite of non-sensical lyrics manages to be an appeasing affair with a strong connect factor and at the same time maintains to hold the audiences attention from beginning till the end. Thus he upheld the track to be played at Discothèques till the New Year's Eve at least. The next track Har Kisi Ko a recomposed version by Chirantan Bhatt of the song of the same name originally composed by Kalyanji Anandji from the 1986 film Janbaaz. The song belonging to soft rock genre scores with the fact that it is not among the umpteen remixes or re-arranged versions that flood the music stands but one that creates makes its own presence felt by reaching out to its audiences more so with Nikhil D'Souza behind the mike in the solo version.

He concluded the review stating 'This one is a winner!'

Marketing
The pre-look poster was released on 12 August 2013, and the first look was released on 13 August 2013. Akshay Kumar released the official teaser of Boss on 14 August 2013, and was premiered with Once Upon ay Time in Mumbai Dobaara! Theatrical trailer was launched on 28 August 2013, coinciding with Krishna Janmashtami.

The star cast of Boss, Akshay Kumar, Aditi and Shiv promoted the film on the show Comedy Nights with Kapil. Akshay Kumar and comedian-actor Johnny Lever made appearance on the longest running comedy show Comedy Circus to promote their film. Akshay Kumar promoted the film on Taarak Mehta Ka Ooltah Chashmah. Akshay will promote the film by jumping from the tallest building in Mumbai.

Guinness record
Boss entered the Guinness World Records for the largest poster after beating Michael Jackson's This Is It. The poster, 58.87 metres wide and 54.94 metres high, was unveiled at Little Gransden Airfield, UK, on 3 October 2013. Macro Arts (UK) did the manufacturing; they had also made the previous Guinness record-holding poster.

Controversy
An objectionable word in Honey Singh song "Party All Night" was muted, after a public interest litigation seeking a stay on release of Boss was filed in Delhi High Court.

Release
Boss was released on 16 October 2013 in 2750 screens worldwide. It was given an U/A certificate by the Censor Board for its action sequences and bikini scenes. Boss was the first Indian movie released in Latin America. It was distributed in Panama, Peru, Denmark and France in addition to the 400 screens already announced across Europe, North America, Southeast Asia and Australia. It was also released in Pakistan on the occasion of Eid al-Adha.

Box office
On its first day, they had an 85–95% occupancy and collected  14.75 crore, but ticket sales dropped to  8 crore on the second day. The film collected  452.5 million at the Indian box office in its five-day-extended first weekend.

Collections further dropped next week, with Boss failing to cross the Rs 500 million mark in the domestic market in the nine-day-extended first week.

Boss had a disappointing second weekend at the domestic box office. The film after gathering income from its 2nd Friday, Saturday and Sunday, managed to make collections of 45 million only. Overall Boss was declared "Flop".

Critical reception
The film received mixed reviews from critics.

Taran Adarsh of Bollywood Hungama gave it 4 out of 5 stars, saying that the film was "designed to magnetize lovers of desi commercial cinema and woo the BO", especially for viewers who like "old-school masaledaar entertainers".

Mohar Basu of Koimoi gave it 2.5 out of 5 and stated that "Akshay Kumar single handedly saves the film from being a sore bore and that is reason enough why Boss deserves a definite shot".

Times of India stated that the film is average.

Mohammad Kamran Jawaid of Dawn gave a positive review, calling it "an idiosyncratic masala fare" where "some of the (film's) in-your-face flagrancy works (and) some doesn't."

References

External links

 
 
 

2010s Hindi-language films
2013 films
2013 action films
Indian action comedy films
Films shot in Thailand
Films shot in Delhi
Films shot in Mumbai
Films shot in Bangkok
Films set in India
Films set in Delhi
2013 masala films
Hindi remakes of Malayalam films
Films scored by Meet Bros Anjjan
Viacom18 Studios films
Hindi-language action films